The following is a list of indoor arenas in Yugoslavia, ordered by capacity.

Arenas

References
Koš 71/72, 72/73, 73/74
Košarkaši i timovi 80/81, 81/82, 82/83, 83/84

See also 
List of indoor arenas in Europe
List of indoor arenas by capacity

 
Yugoslavia
Indoor arenas